George Foreman is an American former professional boxer.

George Foreman may also refer to:
George Foreman (footballer), English footballer
George Foreman III, entrepreneur, boxer, and son of George Foreman

See also
George Foreman Grill, an electrically heated grill promoted by George Foreman
George V. Forman, American businessman